VDL may refer to:

 Vancouver Dodgeball League
 Van Diemen's Land, the former name of the smallest Australian state of Tasmania
 Van Diemen's Land Company in Tasmania
 VDL Groep, Dutch manufacturing company 
 VDL (radio), a name used by two radio stations in the Lebanon 
 Vienna Definition Language in computer programming 
 VHF Data Link
 Ursula von der Leyen, President of the European Commission